Rebora is a surname. Notable people with the surname include:

 Clemente Rebora (1885–1957), Italian poet
 Enrique Rebora (1924–1999), Argentine sports shooter